Korea at the Olympics may refer to:
 North Korea at the Olympics
 South Korea at the Olympics
 Korea at the 2018 Winter Olympics

See also
 Korea at the 2018 Winter Olympics (disambiguation)